Tuulikki Laesson (born March 19, 1969, in Tallinn) is an Estonian chess player who twice won the Estonian Chess Championship for women.

Chess career
Tuulikki Laesson started to play chess at the age of 6. In 1987 she won bronze medal in Soviet Junior Championship in Chelyabinsk. She won Estonian Chess Championship for women in 1993 and 1996, and Open Latvian Chess Championship for women in 1992. Also Tuulikki Laesson won 2 silver medals (1986, 1998) and 2 bronze medals (1992, 1997) in Estonian Chess Championship for women. Tuulikki Laesson played in Soviet Women's Team chess championship in 1986.
Tuulikki Laesson played for Estonia in Chess Olympiads:
 In 1992, at first reserve board in the 30th Chess Olympiad in Manila (+3, =0, -3);
 In 1994, at first reserve board in the 31st Chess Olympiad in Moscow (+5, =3, -1);
 In 1996, at first board in the 32nd Chess Olympiad in Yerevan (+5, =3, -5);
 In 1998, at third board in the 33rd Chess Olympiad in Elista (+5, =2, -3);
 In 2004, at third board in the 36th Chess Olympiad in Calvia (+5, =1, -2).

Personal life
By profession Tuulikki Laesson is a lawyer. She worked in Estonian Ministry of Economic Affairs and Communications and in company "Laesson & Partnerid OÜ".

References

External links
 
 
 
 

1969 births
Living people
Estonian female chess players
Soviet female chess players
Chess Olympiad competitors
Sportspeople from Tallinn
20th-century Estonian lawyers
Estonian women lawyers
21st-century Estonian lawyers